The Blohm & Voss P 196 was the last of Blohm & Voss's World War II design projects for a "stuka" dive bomber and close support aircraft to replace the aging Junkers Ju 87.

Design

Twin BMW 003 engines were slung in pods under the fuselage center section. To make room for the main undercarriage twin tail booms were attached to the straight, tapered wings, with the undercarriage retracting into the front of the booms. The tailplane was raised midway up the twin tail fins to clear the jet exhaust, with twin tailwheels retracting beneath.

Up to two  bombs could be carried in bays within the tail booms. Forward-firing armament comprised two MK 412 cannon and two MG-151 guns.

Specification

References

Notes

Bibliography
 Hugh Cowin; "Blohm und Voss Projects of World War II", Air Pictorial, October 1963, pp. 312–316.
 David Masters; German Jet Genesis, Jane's, 1982, p. 28.

P 196
Abandoned military aircraft projects of Germany
World War II jet aircraft of Germany